The 2016 UTEP Miners football team represented the University of Texas at El Paso in the 2016 NCAA Division I FBS football season. The Miners played their home games at the Sun Bowl Stadium in El Paso, Texas, and competed in the West Division of Conference USA (C–USA). They were led by fourth-year head coach Sean Kugler. They finished the season 4–8, 2–6 in C-USA play to finish in a tie for fifth place in the West Division. UTEP averaged 23,001 fans per game.

Schedule
UTEP announced its 2016 football schedule on February 4, 2016. The 2016 schedule consisted of seven home and five away games in the regular season. The Miners host C–USA foes Florida International (FIU), North Texas, Old Dominion, and Southern Miss, and traveled to Florida Atlantic, Louisiana Tech, Rice, and UTSA.

The team play four non-conference games, three home games against Army, Houston Baptist from the Southland Conference and New Mexico State from the Sun Belt Conference, and one road game against the Texas Longhorns from the Big 12 Conference.

Schedule Source:

Game summaries

New Mexico State

at Texas

Army

Southern Miss

at Louisiana Tech

FIU

at UTSA

Old Dominion

Houston Baptist

at Florida Atlantic

at Rice

North Texas

References

UTEP
UTEP Miners football seasons
UTEP Miners football